Harti  is a very small town in Gadag district, Karnataka, India, with many ancient and modern Hindu temples.

Importance
Harti is well known for Shri Basaveshwara Temple and for its annual festival Jatra that is held on the last Monday of Shravana Masa. It is amazing to watch the procession of the Dhyamamma statue on this festival day.

There are ancient temples built in Chalukya regime such as the Parvati Parameshwara Temple * with stone carvings.

Harti has only half a dozen Muslim families and it has a tiny mosque for them. They celebrate Moharram on the last day of every year and most of the Hindus also participate in this Muslim festival, while the Muslims also participate in Hindu Festivals.

Transport
Gadag is the nearest railway station. The nearest Airport is at Hubli, the next international Airport is at Bangalore.

See also
 Venkatapura, Gadag
 Pethalur
 Halligudi
 Harti (Gadag district) 
 Gadag
 Lakkundi
 Dambal
 Hombal

References

Villages in Gadag district
Western Chalukya Empire
Chalukya dynasty